Strioturbonilla sigmoidea is a species of sea snail, a marine gastropod mollusk in the family Pyramidellidae, the pyrams and their allies.

Distribution
This marine species occurs in the following locations:
 Angola
 Atlantic Europe
 European waters (ERMS scope)
 Mediterranean Sea
 Morocco
 Portuguese Exclusive Economic Zone
 Spanish Exclusive Economic Zone
 United Kingdom Exclusive Economic Zone
 West Africa

References

External links
 To Biodiversity Heritage Library (1 publication)
 To CLEMAM
 To Encyclopedia of Life

Pyramidellidae
Gastropods described in 1880
Molluscs of the Atlantic Ocean
Molluscs of the Mediterranean Sea